Wingfield Castle in the parish of Wingfield in Suffolk, England is a fortified manor house which was the ancestral home of the Wingfield family and their heirs, the de la Pole family, created Earls and Dukes of Suffolk. It is now a private house. Sir John de Wingfield (d. circa 1361), of Wingfield, chief administrator to Edward the Black Prince (1330–1376), was the last male of his line, whose daughter and heiress Catherine Wingfield married Michael de la Pole, seated at Wingfield Castle, who in 1385 was created Earl of Suffolk. His descendant Edmund de la Pole, 3rd Duke of Suffolk (1472–1513) was forced to surrender his dukedom in 1493. It was resurrected by King Henry VIII in 1514 for his favourite Charles Brandon, 1st Duke of Suffolk (1484–1545), who although he had no close connection with Wingfield Castle and the county of Suffolk, was a great-grandson of Sir Robert Wingfield (died 1454), of Letheringham in Suffolk, about 12 miles south of Wingfield.

History
In 1384 records show that Michael de la Pole, 1st Earl of Suffolk applied for royal licence to crenellate his manor house. The need for the old castle had already ceased to exist by this time and kings were not pleased to see such strongholds built, so Wingfield Castle is a cross between a fortress and a standard moated manor house.

Wingfield Castle passed into the hands of the Catlin family from Norwich. In 1702, Sir Nevill Catlin died there and his widow Mary carried the manor to her second husband Sir Charles Turner, 1st Baronet, of Warham. Lord Berners sold the Castle in 1886 to the Adair family.  Lady Darrell, a descendant of Lord Berners, sold the castle in 1981 to a Mr. Wingrove. Two years later it was sold to a Mr. Gerald Fairhurst, who spent time in refurbishing it prior to its sale to a London businessman in 1987; and in 1989 it was again sold, this time to a barrister with the surname Gunter.
The old Manor House and part of the fortifications were dismantled in 1510 and the present domestic quarters were constructed in about 1540 in the south west corner of the remaining fortifications. At that time the existing Tudor brick merlons on top of the south curtain wall were added.

The entrance gateway is approached over a bridge, which still bears the grooves of the former gate, drawbridge and portcullis. The walls are built of flint cobbles with stone for the coigns and windows. The plan of the site is quadrilateral, almost square, the west side being a little longer than the east, an enclosure of about an acre and a half. Besides the almost perfect front, the foundations of the north and east walls and two more towers are traceable. A brick bridge now leads up to the noble gatehouse where the fine depressed pointed archway, deeply recessed and moulded, still shows the portcullis groove and the old oak gates. On either side of the archway are sculptured stone panels depicting the coat of arms of de Wingfield and de la Pole.

The whole castle wall was apparently intact at the beginning of the 20th century, but the north and east walls had been demolished by 1945. A drawbridge still spans the eastern side of the moat. It has been extensively reconstructed, but retains some of the original timbers.

The castle was the inspiration for Godsend Castle, the home of the Mortmain family in the 1949 novel I Capture The Castle by Dodie Smith.

See also
Castles in Great Britain and Ireland
List of castles in England

References

External links
Bibliography of sources relating to Wingfield Castle

Castles in Suffolk
Wingfield family
Country houses in Suffolk
Grade I listed buildings in Suffolk
Grade I listed houses